Trilogy of Terror is a 1968 Brazilian horror film directed by José Mojica Marins, Luís Sérgio Person and Ozualdo Candeias. The film consists of 3 stories adapted from the Brazilian TV series Além, Muito Além do Além (Beyond, Much Beyond the Beyond): O Acordo (The Agreement), A Procissão dos Mortos (Procession of Dead), and Pesadelo Macabro (Macabre Nightmare).

Plot

The Agreement (O Acordo) 
A mother becomes involved with black magic and offers a virgin woman to the devil in exchange for curing the illness of her only son. (40 minutes)

Cast: Lucy Rangel, Regina Célia, Durvalino de Souza, Luis Humberto, Alex Ronay, Henrique Borgens, Ugarte, Nádia Tell, Éddio Smani, Eucaris de Morais.

Procession of Dead (A Procissão dos Mortos)
A poor laborer is the only man in one village with courage to face a group of guerrilheiros ("guerrilla ghosts") that haunt the minds of the local villagers. (28 minutes)

Cast: Lima Duarte, Cassilda Lanuza, Waldir Guedes, Carlos Alberto Romano, Roberto Ferreira (Zé Coió), Lenoir Bittencourt, Pontes Santos, Wilson Júnior, Francisco Ribeiro.

Macabre Nightmare (Pesadelo Macabro)
A young man named Claudio (Mário Lima) is obsessed by fear of reptiles and spiders and the fear of being buried alive. When he undergoes a shocking event, he becomes unresponsive and is mistakenly buried, only to revive in the coffin after burial. His screams of terror from underground go unheard by the villagers (31 minutes)

Cast: Mário Lima, Vany Miller, Nelson Gasparini, Ingrid Holt, Walter C. Portella, Kátia Dumont, Francis Mary, Milene Drumont, Sebastião Grandin, Paula Ramos.

References

External links 
 Official film site 

Trilogy of Terror on Portal Heco de Cinema 

1968 films
1968 horror films
Brazilian horror films
Films directed by José Mojica Marins
1960s Portuguese-language films
Films directed by Luis Sérgio Person
Brazilian anthology films